Katy Keene is an American musical comedy-drama television series developed by Roberto Aguirre-Sacasa and Michael Grassi. It was based on the Archie Comics character of the same name. It chronicled the origins and struggles of four aspiring artists trying to attain successful careers on Broadway, on the runway, and in the recording studio. Katy Keene was a spin-off of Riverdale, and took place five years after the events of the former series. The series was produced by Berlanti Productions, in association with Archie Comics, CBS Television Studios, and Warner Bros. Television.

Lucy Hale starred as Katy Keene, an aspiring fashion designer trying to navigate her way in New York City. Ashleigh Murray, Camille Hyde, Jonny Beauchamp, Julia Chan, Lucien Laviscount, Zane Holtz, and Katherine LaNasa also starred, with Murray reprising her role as Josie McCoy from Riverdale. In January 2019, the series received a pilot order from The CW, to be considered for a series order in the 2019–20 television season. The series was filmed in New York City. The show was picked up to series in May 2019. The series premiered on The CW on February 6, 2020, with the series finale airing on May 14, 2020. In July 2020, the series was canceled after one season due to the COVID-19 pandemic.

Following the season finale, it was announced that the show would be the first CW show not to be released on either Netflix or the CW's own website and app, but instead would be part of HBO Max's debut lineup as an exclusive. It was the first CW show not to be offered to Netflix following the completion of its broadcast season. Following the announcement of the series' cancellation, the entire series was also made available on the CW website and app.

Premise
The series followed the professional and romantic lives of four Archie Comics characters, including fashion legend-to-be Katy Keene and singer-songwriter Josie McCoy, five years after the events of Riverdale, as they chased their dreams in New York City. The series infused music into the plotlines and followed the origins, trials, and tribulations of four struggling artists who are desperate to make it in the spotlight.

Cast and characters

Main

 Lucy Hale as Katy Keene: An aspiring fashion designer trying to navigate her way in New York City. This character was introduced in a crossover episode with Riverdale.
 Ashleigh Murray as Josie McCoy: A singer-songwriter chasing her music dreams in the Big Apple. This character was introduced in Riverdale. McCoy is now an adult, with Katy Keene being set five years after the previous series.
 Katherine LaNasa as Gloria Grandbilt: A personal shopper at the luxury department store Lacy's, which caters to the rich and famous.
 Julia Chan as Pepper Smith: An it girl with a mysterious background who wants to open up a studio for aspiring artist. The character is loosely based on Russian-German con artist Anna Sorokin.
 Jonny Beauchamp as Jorge / Ginger Lopez: An aspiring Broadway performer who wants to take his drag career to the next level. A different version of the character was introduced in the first season of Riverdale, portrayed by Caitlin Mitchell-Markovitch.
 Lucien Laviscount as Alexander "Alex" Cabot: The CEO of his father's company who dreams of reopening a dead record label.
 Zane Holtz as K.O. Kelly: A boxer and Katy's longtime boyfriend who dreams of fighting a welterweight championship in Madison Square Garden, and makes ends meet as a personal trainer and bouncer.
 Camille Hyde as Alexandra "Xandra" Cabot: A powerful New York socialite who is trying to work her way up in her father's company. She is the senior vice president of Cabot Entertainment. She also dislikes Josie McCoy.

Recurring

 Nathan Lee Graham as François: A visual merchandiser at Lacy's.
 Heléne Yorke as Amanda: One of Gloria's assistants who sees Katy as a competitor.
 Daphne Rubin-Vega as Luisa Lopez: Jorge's mother, a former Rockette and now co-owner of a bodega.
 Saamer Usmani as Prince Errol Swoon: A royal prince of a foreign country.
 André De Shields as Chubby: Josie's boss at a record store.
 Erica Pappas as Patricia Klein: Prince Errol's fiancee.
 Ryan Faucett as Bernardo Bixby: A firefighter and Jorge's love interest.
 Frank Pando as Luis Lopez: Jorge's father and co-owner of the bodega with Luisa.
 Candace Maxwell as Didi: Pepper's assistant and love interest.
 Abubakr Ali as Raj Patel: KO's roommate, a filmmaker and one of Pepper's love interests. 
 Luke Cook as Guy LaMontagne: A famous fashion designer.
 Bernadette Peters as Miss Freesia: A wealthy Upper East sider and Pepper's mother figure who taught her the art of the con.
 Eric Freeman as Buzz Brown: A former love interest of Jorge's
 Mary Beth Peil as Loretta Lacy: Lacy's owner.
 Azriel Crews as Cricket: the shy keyboardist in the revived Josie and the Pussycats
 Emily Rafala as Trula Twyst: The activist drummer in the revived Josie and the Pussycats

Guest
 Casey Wilson as herself: An actress and Guy LaMontagne's client for the Meta Gala. Wilson played a fictionalized version of herself.
 Cary Elwes as Leo Lacy: Loretta Lacy's son who seems to have a connection with Katy's mother.

Crossover characters from Riverdale
 Robin Givens as Sierra McCoy: Josie's mother, lawyer and former mayor of Riverdale.
 Casey Cott as Kevin Keller: Josie's step-brother and friend from high school.
 Mark Consuelos as Hiram Lodge: A businessman from Riverdale and the CEO of Lodge Industries.

Episodes

Production

Development
In August 2018, Roberto Aguirre-Sacasa revealed that another spin-off was in the works at The CW. He said that the potential spin-off would be "very different from Riverdale" and that it would be produced "in [the 2018–19] development cycle." On January 23, 2019, The CW issued an official pilot order for the series that will "[follow] the lives and loves of four iconic Archie Comics characters — including fashion legend-to-be Katy Keene — as they chase their twenty-something dreams in New York City. This musical dramedy chronicles the origins and struggles of four aspiring artists trying to make it on Broadway, on the runway and in the recording studio." On May 7, 2019, The CW ordered the show to series. On January 7, 2020, The CW ordered thirteen more scripts for the series. On July 2, 2020, The CW canceled the series after one season due to the COVID-19 pandemic.

Casting
On February 4, 2019, it was announced that Ashleigh Murray, who stars in Riverdale, had been cast in a lead role in the spinoff, exiting Riverdale. On February 21, 2019, Jonny Beauchamp and Julia Chan joined the cast of the series as Jorge Lopez and Pepper Smith, respectively. A few days later, on February 26, 2019, Camille Hyde and Lucien Laviscount joined the cast as brother and sister duo, Alexandra and Alexander Cabot. Finally, on March 11, 2019, Lucy Hale was cast in the series' lead and titular role.

Filming
The series is filmed in New York City.

Connection to Riverdale
On August 4, 2019, Michael Grassi announced that there was going to be a crossover between Riverdale and Katy Keene in the future. The crossover episode aired on February 5, 2020, as a part of Riverdale, and introduced Katy for the first time.

Katy Keene crosses over with Riverdale in the sixth episode when Robin Givens reprises her role as Sierra McCoy from Riverdale. Four episodes later, Casey Cott reprises his role as Kevin Keller in episode ten. In the last episode of the first season, Mark Consuelos reprises his role as Hiram Lodge.

Despite the cancellation, characters from Katy Keene appear in Riverdale: Zane Holtz reprised his role as K.O. Kelly in the first episode of season five and in the tenth episode of season six, followed by Ryan Faucett as Bernardo in the seventh episode of the same season, Lucy Hale reprised her role in a voice-over cameo in the eighth episode, and Camille Hyde reprised her role as Alexandra Cabot in the fifteenth episode. The character Chad Gekko, who appeared in two episodes of Katy Keene, also returns as a recurring characters in season five, played by Chris Mason. Mason replaces Reid Prebenda, who portrayed the character in the spin-off.

Music
Musical performances are featured throughout the series, a blend of cover versions and originals. Songs performed in episodes are released as digital singles after broadcast by WaterTower Music.

Following the end of the season, the label released a digital compilation for season 1 songs. The series also include a musical episode with its own soundtrack was released on WaterTower. The Kiss of the Spider Woman soundtrack, was released on March 20, 2020.

Release

Marketing
On May 16, 2019, The CW released the first official trailer for the series. The series' extended trailer was released in August 2019.

International broadcast

The series was acquired for the UK by the BBC in July 2020 for its on-demand service BBC iPlayer

Reception

Critical response
On Rotten Tomatoes, the series has an approval rating of 91% based on 23 reviews, with an average rating of 6.7/10. The website's critical consensus reads, "Katy Keene definitely has style to spare, but its greatest strength is its warm, joyous tone that sparkles in a sea of gritty YA TV." On Metacritic, it has a weighted average score of 71 out of 100 based on 8 reviews, indicating "generally favorable reviews".

Ratings

References

External links
 

2020 American television series debuts
2020 American television series endings
2020s American comedy-drama television series
2020s American LGBT-related comedy television series
2020s American LGBT-related drama television series
2020s American musical comedy television series
American television spin-offs
The CW original programming
English-language television shows
Fashion-themed television series
Television shows based on Archie Comics
Television series based on singers and musicians
Television series by CBS Studios
Television series by Warner Bros. Television Studios
Television series set in the 2020s
Television shows filmed in New York (state)
Television shows set in New York City
Television series created by Roberto Aguirre-Sacasa
Television productions cancelled due to the COVID-19 pandemic